Marvin Clement Olson [Sparky] (May 28, 1907 – February 5, 1998) was a second baseman in Major League Baseball who played from  through  for the Boston Red Sox. A native of Gayville, South Dakota, he attended Luther College.

Olson was a late-season callup by the Red Sox in 1931 and the starting second baseman for much of 1932. In 1933, Olson appeared in three games before being traded to the New York Yankees on May 15, along with Johnny Watwood and cash, for Dusty Cooke, but would never appear in another major league game. He did, however, continue to play in the minor leagues for various teams until 1947.

In a three-season major league career, Olson was a .241 hitter (110-for-403) with 67 runs and 30 RBI in 133 games, including 15 doubles, six triples and one stolen base with no home runs.

Olson died at the age of 90 in Tyndall, South Dakota.

External links

Retrosheet

1907 births
1998 deaths
Baltimore Orioles (IL) players
Baseball players from South Dakota
Boston Red Sox players
Buffalo Bisons (minor league) players
Chattanooga Lookouts managers
Chattanooga Lookouts players
Jamestown Falcons players
Kansas City Athletics scouts
Major League Baseball second basemen
Minnesota Twins scouts
Montgomery Rebels players
Newark Bears (IL) players
People from Yankton County, South Dakota
Syracuse Chiefs players